The Asahiflex was a 35 mm single-lens reflex camera built by the Asahi Optical Corporation (later to become Pentax).  It was regarded as the first SLR camera built in Japan.

Asahi Optical introduced its first 35 mm camera in 1952. Unlike the majority of Japanese camera manufacturers of the time, Asahi made a conscious decision not to produce a mere German rangefinder copy, a relatively simple task. Instead, Asahi decided to copy the Praktiflex, a 1939 design, made in the German Democratic Republic. Asahi's designers (Nobuyuki Yoshida and Ryohei Suzuki) were convinced of the inherent superiority of the SLR and so proceeded along these lines. This effort resulted in the Asahiflex I, which was also the first Japanese 35 mm SLR.

Asahiflex I
The Asahiflex I had a non-interchangeable waist-level viewfinder, with a direct optical viewfinder for eye-level use. Like the Praktiflex the Asahiflex I do not have a returning mirror (which means the mirror will only be back to its initial position to redirect light to the viewfinder for composing and range finding work after the operators had wound the film) and shutter speeds from 1/20 to 1/500 and B. The camera used the M37 screw mount. The Asahiflex I went through some minor modifications for flash use, resulting in the IA.

Asahiflex IIB
The Asahiflex IIB was released in 1954. With the IIB, a key advance was made, the quick-return mirror. It was the world's first SLR camera with an instant return mirror. The problem of mirror black-out was one of the main problems with prior SLR designs, greatly reducing usability and leading to the greater popularity of the rangefinder. With the IIB there emerged the first practical quick-return mirror, a vital innovation and one which was quickly adopted by other manufacturers. With the final model in the series, the IIA, the Asahiflex gained slow speeds from 1/25th of a second to 1/2 of a second.

Asahiflex series
 Asahiflex I (1952–1953)
 Asahiflex IA (1953–1954)
 Asahiflex IIB (1954–1956)
 Asahiflex IIA (1955–1957)

See also

 Pentax
 Pentax cameras
 History of the single-lens reflex camera

References
2. "Asahiflex I - Pentax M37 Screwmount Slrs - Pentax Camera Reviews And Specifications". Pentaxforums.Com, 2022, https://www.pentaxforums.com/camerareviews/asahiflex-a.html.
Pentax SLR cameras
135 film cameras
Japanese inventions